Gurmit Singh Kular (1907 – 4 February 1992) was an Indian field hockey player who competed in the 1932 Summer Olympics.

He was born in Sansarpur, Jalandhar and died in Punjab.

In 1932 he was a member of the Indian field hockey team, which won the gold medal. He played two matches as forward and scored eight goals.

External links
 
 Sikh Hockey Olympians profile
 Database Olympics profile

1907 births
1992 deaths
Field hockey players from Jalandhar
Olympic field hockey players of India
Field hockey players at the 1932 Summer Olympics
Indian male field hockey players
Olympic gold medalists for India
Olympic medalists in field hockey
Medalists at the 1932 Summer Olympics